Melrose Park is a suburb of Adelaide, South Australia in the City of Mitcham.  It is bordered by South Road, Daws Road, Winston Avenue and Edward Street.  Until 1989, Melrose Park was part of the suburb of Edwardstown. The name change occurred as the suburb was quite large, located on either side of South Road and was in the jurisdiction of two local government councils, with the larger western side belonging to the City of Marion. The suburb was named after early South Australian aviator, Charles James Melrose.

References

Suburbs of Adelaide